Torrington is a city in, and the county seat of, Goshen County, Wyoming, United States. The population was 6,501 at the 2010 census.

It is the home of Eastern Wyoming College, and is the surrounding region's center of commercial activity. Within this primarily agricultural community, there are several fertilizer plants, a sugar beet factory, and numerous tourist facilities and retail businesses that serve the local and nearby rural populations.

History

Situated on the historic Mormon Trail and near the Oregon and California trails along the banks of the North Platte River, Torrington was founded in 1900 by W.G. Curtis (1857–1913), and named by him for his home town of Torrington, Connecticut. Originally a watering and coaling station for the CB&Q Railroad, which began passenger service in 1900, the growing city soon became the main source of civilization for nearby farmers and ranchers. In 1905, the first bridge was constructed over the North Platte River, which it had previously been necessary to ford.

A post office called Torrington was established in 1889 on W. G. Curtis' farm three miles west of where the town of Torrington would be in 1900, with W. G. Curtis serving as Postmaster and later as mayor. By 1908 the town was incorporated as a town in Laramie County. It had a bank, three general stores, a pharmacy with a soda fountain, a land office, and two hotels (for one of which the building, although modified, still exists at 1841 Main Street.) It soon became a central place of trade for Goshen County, and for surrounding areas in eastern Wyoming and western Nebraska.

Situated on the North Platte River in eastern Wyoming near the Nebraska border, the town site survey began in April 1900, by Ashland B. Smith of the Lincoln Land Company of Nebraska. The survey and plating was completed and recorded in public records in Cheyenne on June 22, 1900, individual plots of the land were sold to residents for one dollar each by Charles Henry Morrill, President of the Lincoln Land Company. More The Torrington Telegram (which was still published in 2015) was established in 1911. The 1900 United States Census lists only 71 inhabitants in the Torrington Precinct and does not list it as a town. All were stock growers, ranch laborers, cowboys or at school. Only one was listed as a Hardware clerk

Also in 1911, Goshen County was officially organized.  The County was created from what had previously been a portion of the northern end of Laramie County. The towns of Torrington and nearby Lingle—some 10 miles away—both competed for designation as the county seat. Torrington ultimately prevailed, and was selected, after Torrington residents were able to raise sufficient funds for a construction of a courthouse. The cornerstone for the courthouse was set in 1913, during a ceremony where a band played, conducted by Hi Yoder—from whose family the nearby town of Yoder, Wyoming, takes its name.

Also by that time, early motor cars started showing up in town, the Goshen County Fair Association had been established, and in 1915 Torrington had a population of 443. In 1919, the Trail Hotel building, which still exists at 2001 Main Street, was constructed. In 1925, the Union Pacific Railroad based in Omaha constructed a spur line from Cheyenne to South Torrington, to serve the proposed Holly Sugar Corporation plant which began operations in 1926.

The large, 24-hour Holly Sugar factory, which processes sugar beets, was still operating in 2015 as a major employer for the Torrington area, and the preserved historic Union Pacific Depot building now houses the Goshen County Homesteaders Museum.

The Torrington Livestock Commission, established in 1934, still held twice-weekly livestock auctions in 2015. It is the largest livestock auction operation and barn in Wyoming, and ranks as the third to fifth largest livestock auction in the United States. Drawing cattle from a nine-state region (Nebraska, Colorado, Arizona, Nevada, Utah, Idaho, South Dakota, Montana and the bulk of Wyoming) the Torrington livestock auction barn attracts buyers from all over the nation. And, Goshen County ranked number one in Wyoming for its cattle inventory.Torrington Livestock Commission Retrieved June 30, 2015

Today, when traveling between Torrington and Guernsey, Wyoming, motorists will be following the path of the historic Oregon and Mormon Trail as they make their way along the banks of the North Platte River past the site of the 1854 Grattan Massacre near Lingle, and past the historic western 19th-Century U.S. Army Cavalry outpost, Fort Laramie National Historic Site.

Geography
Torrington is located at  (42.066542, −104.182471).

Climate
Torrington, situated on the North Platte River, has a semi-arid climate (Köppen climate classification BSk).

Demographics

2010 census
As of the census of 2010, there were 6,501 people, 2,527 households, and 1,506 families living in the city. The racial makeup of the city was 93.2% White, 1.0% African American, 0.9% Native American, 0.5% Asian, 0.2% Pacific Islander, 3.0% from other races, and 1.3% from two or more races. Hispanic or Latino of any race were 11.3% of the population.

There were 2,527 households, of which 26.0% had children under the age of 18 living with them, 44.8% were married couples living together, 10.2% had a female householder with no husband present, 4.6% had a male householder with no wife present, and 40.4% were non-families. 34.5% of all households were made up of individuals, and 16.1% had someone living alone who was 65 years of age or older. The average household size was 2.21 and the average family size was 2.83.

The median age in the city was 41.4 years. 19.8% of residents were under the age of 18; 11.1% were between the ages of 18 and 24; 23.2% were from 25 to 44; 26.8% were from 45 to 64; and 19.3% were 65 years of age or older. The gender makeup of the city was 52.5% male and 47.5% female.

2000 census
At the census of 2000, there were 5,776 people, 2,436 households, and 1,522 families living in the city. The population density was 1,617.4 people per square mile (624.7/km2). There were 2,644 housing units at an average density of 740.4 per square mile (286.0/km2). The racial makeup of the city was 93.49% White, 0.31% African American, 0.90% Native American, 0.29% Asian, 0.10% Pacific Islander, 3.65% from other races, and 1.25% from two or more races.  Hispanic or Latino of any race were 9.47% of the population.

There were 2,436 households, out of which 26.7% had children under the age of 18 living with them, 49.9% were married couples living together, 9.9% had a female householder with no husband present, and 37.5% were non-families. 32.3% of all households were made up of individuals, and 17.3% had someone living alone who was 65 years of age or older. The average household size was 2.26 and the average family size was 2.86.

The age distribution was: 23.3% under the age of 18, 9.6% from 18 to 24, 23.1% from 25 to 44, 22.9% from 45 to 64, and 21.0% who were 65 years of age or older. The median age was 41 years. For every 100 females, there were 93.0 males. For every 100 females age 18 and over, there were 87.1 males.

The median income for a household in the city was $30,136, and the median income for a family was $40,750. Males had a median income of $31,058 versus $20,101 for females. The per capita income for the city was $16,026. About 9.3% of families and 13.3% of the population were below the poverty line, including 16.0% of those under age 18 and 11.3% of those age 65 or over.

Government
The United States Postal Service operates the Torrington Post Office.

The Wyoming Medium Correctional Institution (WMCI) is located in Torrington."Wyoming Medium Correctional Institution (WMCI) ." Goshen County GIS Department. 2009. Retrieved on December 12, 2010.  WMCI, a facility of the Wyoming Department of Corrections, serves as an intake center for male inmates not sentenced to death. It was opened on January 6, 2010, and the first 75 inmates to be housed there arrived on January 13, 2010. By 2015, it housed over 300 inmates.

Education

Public education in Torrington is provided by Goshen County School District#1. Zoned campuses include Lincoln Elementary School (grades K–2), Trail Elementary School (grades 3–5), Torrington Middle School (grades 6–8), and Torrington High School (grades 9–12).

Other towns and communities included in the consolidated Goshen County School District include Lingle, LaGrange, Huntley, and Yoder, among others.

Eastern Wyoming College, located in Torrington, is a two-year community college serving the area, with outreach centers serving Platte, Niobrara, Converse, Weston and Crook counties.

Torrington has a public library, the Goshen County Library.

Infrastructure
Highways
U.S. Highways
 U.S. Highway 26 East (Scottsbluff Road)
 U.S. Highway 26 West (Yellowstone Road)
 U.S. Highway 85 North (Lingle/Jay Em Road)
 U.S. Highway 85 South (Cheyenne Road)

State Routes

Airport
Torrington Municipal Airport is a city-owned, public-use airport located two nautical miles (4 km) east of the central business district of Torrington.

Public transport
Goshen County Senior Friendship Center provides paratransit services in Torrington on weekdays.

Notable people
 Edward Buchanan (born 1967), former state legislator and Torrington lawyer; Speaker of the Wyoming House of Representatives from 2011 to 2012
Stephanie Burns (born 1955), Organosilicon chemist, businesswoman
 William Curtis, founded Torrington in 1889 
 Stanley Hathaway (1924–2005), 27th Governor of Wyoming, 1967–1975; 40th U.S. Secretary of the Interior, 1975
 Jerry Hill (born 1939), former University of Wyoming and NFL football player (Baltimore Colts 1961–1970; Super Bowls III and V)
 Lexie Madden (born 1991), Miss Wyoming, 2012. 3rd Runner Up for Miss America 2013
 Michael Punke (born 1964), Author of The Revenant''

References

External links
 City of Torrington, official website
 Torrington History, Wyoming Tales and Trails

 
Cities in Goshen County, Wyoming
Cities in Wyoming
County seats in Wyoming
Populated places established in 1889
1889 establishments in Wyoming Territory